Lazare Gianessi (9 November 1925 – 10 August 2009) was a French football defender. He was also part of France's squad for the football tournament at the 1948 Summer Olympics, but he did not play in any matches.

References

External links
 
 Profile
 Profile

1925 births
2009 deaths
French footballers
France international footballers
Association football defenders
Ligue 1 players
Ligue 2 players
RC Lens players
AS Monaco FC players
Olympic footballers of France
Footballers at the 1948 Summer Olympics
1954 FIFA World Cup players
French people of Italian descent
Olympique Saint-Quentin players
CO Roubaix-Tourcoing players